IRNSS-1D is a satellite in the Indian Regional Navigational Satellite System (IRNSS) constellation. The satellite is the fourth of seven in the constellation, launched after IRNSS-1A, IRNSS-1B and IRNSS-1C. The satellite is the only satellite in the constellation slated to provide navigational services to the region. The satellite will be placed in geosynchronous orbit. It was launched successfully on 28 March 2015 onboard ISRO's PSLV-C27 from Satish Dhawan Space Center, Sriharikota.

Satellite
The satellite will help in augmenting the satellite based navigation system of India which is currently under development. The navigational system so developed will be a regional one targeted towards South Asia. The satellite will provide navigation, tracking and mapping services.

IRNSS-1D satellite has two payloads: a navigation payload and CDMA ranging payload in addition with a laser retro-reflector. The payload generates navigation signals at L5 and S-band. The design of the payload makes the IRNSS system inter-operable and compatible with Global Positioning System (GPS) and Galileo. The satellite is powered by two solar arrays, which generate power up to 1,660 watts, and has a life-time of ten years.

Cost
The total cost of the mission was estimated at 14 billion.

See also

 Communication-Centric Intelligence Satellite (CCI-Sat)
 GPS-aided geo-augmented navigation (GAGAN)
 Satellite navigation

References

External links
 ISRO Future Programmes

2015 in India
Spacecraft launched in 2015
IRNSS satellites
Spacecraft launched by PSLV rockets